Apnea of prematurity is defined as cessation of breathing by a premature infant that lasts for more than 20 seconds and/or is accompanied by hypoxia or bradycardia. Apnea is traditionally classified as either obstructive, central, or mixed. Obstructive apnea may occur when the infant's neck is hyperflexed or conversely, hyperextended.  It may also occur due to low pharyngeal muscle tone or to inflammation of the soft tissues, which can block the flow of air though the pharynx and vocal cords. Central apnea occurs when there is a lack of respiratory effort. This may result from central nervous system immaturity, or from the effects of medications or illness. Many episodes of apnea of prematurity may start as either obstructive or central, but then involve elements of both, becoming mixed in nature.

Pathophysiology

Ventilatory drive is primarily dependent on response to increased levels of carbon dioxide (CO2) and acid in the blood. A secondary stimulus is hypoxia. Responses to these stimuli are impaired in premature infants due to immaturity of specialized regions of the brain that sense these changes.  In addition, premature infants have an exaggerated response to laryngeal stimulation (a normal reflex that closes the airway as a protective measure).

Diagnosis

Apnea of prematurity can be readily identified from other forms of infant apnea such as obstructive apnea, hypoventilation syndromes, breathing regulation issues during feeding, and reflux associated apnea with an infant pneumogram or infant apnea/sleep study.

It has been reported that the incidence of neonatal apnea happens in almost all infants with gestational age of less than 29 weeks or the birth weight of less than 1000g.

Treatment

Medications

Methylxanthines (theophylline and caffeine) have been used for almost three decades to treat apnea of prematurity. Despite this prevalent use, there are concerns of long term negative effects from the use of caffeine. Caffeine and theophylline have similar short-term effects on apnea, but theophylline is associated with higher rates of toxicity.

Respiratory support

Simple tactile stimulation by touching the skin or patting the infant may stop an apneic episode by raising the infant's level of alertness.  Increasing the environmental oxygen level by placing the infant in a tent or hood with supplemental oxygen can diminish the frequency of AOP, and may also help the infant maintain adequate oxygenation during short episodes of apnea.  Increased oxygen at low levels can also be delivered using a nasal cannula, which additionally may provide some stimulation due to the tactile stimulation of the cannula.  CPAP (continuous positive airway pressure) is sometimes used for apnea when medications and supplemental oxygen are not sufficient.  Usually as a last resort, mechanical ventilation is used to support infants whose apnea cannot be controlled sufficiently by other methods and where the potential risk of harm from recurrent hypoxia is felt to outweigh the risks of injury from ventilation.

Monitoring

In-hospital monitors in the NICU typically measure respiratory movements, heartrate, and pulse oximetry.  Central apnea can be detected quickly since it results in absence of respiratory movements.  Obstructive apnea can be detected when the level of oxygen has declined in the blood and/or results in slowing of the heart rate.

Home apnea monitors (which must be distinguished from infant monitors that are designed only to allow parents to listen to the infant remotely) most frequently measure only respiratory movements and/or heart rate.  They are generally used with premature infants who are otherwise ready for discharge, but who continue to require supplemental oxygen or medication for mild residual AOP.  Home apnea monitoring is typically required for 6–12 weeks after discharge.

Outcome

Since AOP is fundamentally a problem of the immaturity of the physiological systems of the premature infant, it is a self-limited condition that will resolve when these systems mature.  It is unusual for an infant to continue to have significant problems with AOP beyond 43 weeks post-conceptual age.

Infants who have had AOP are at increased risk of recurrence of apnea in response to exposure to anesthetic agents, at least until around 52 weeks post-conceptual age.

There is no evidence that a history of AOP places an infant at increased risk for SIDS.  However, any premature infant (regardless of whether they have had AOP) is at increased risk of SIDS.  It is important that other factors related to SIDS risk be avoided (exposure to smoking, prone sleeping, excess bedding materials, etc.)

Epidemiology

Apnea of prematurity occurs in at least 85 percent of infants who are born at less than 34 weeks of gestation. The incidence is inversely related to the gestational maturity of the infant, but has considerable individual variability.

References

External links

Breathing abnormalities
Preterm birth